Dischissus mirandus is a species of beetle in the family Carabidae, the only species in the genus Dischissus.

References

Panagaeinae